Marks' Standard Handbook for Mechanical Engineers is a comprehensive handbook for the field of mechanical engineering. Originally based on the even older German , it was first published in 1916 by Lionel Simeon Marks. In 2017, its 12th edition, published by McGraw-Hill, marked the 100th anniversary of the work. The handbook was translated into several languages.

Lionel S. Marks was a professor of mechanical engineering at Harvard University and Massachusetts Institute of Technology in the early 1900s.

Topics
The 11th edition consists of 20 sections:

 Mathematical Tables and Measuring Units
 Mathematics
 Mechanics of Solids and Fluids
 Heat
 Strength of Materials
 Materials of Engineering 
 Fuels and Furnaces
 Machine Elements
 Power Generation
 Materials Handling 
 Transportation
 Building Construction and Equipment
 Manufacturing Processes
 Fans, Pumps, and Compressors 
 Electrical and Electronics Engineering 
 Instruments and Controls 
 Industrial Engineering
 The Regulatory Environment
 Refrigeration, Cryogenics, and Optics
 Emerging Technologies

Editions

 English editions:
 1st edition, 1916, edited by Lionel Simeon Marks, based on the German 
 2nd edition, 1924, edited by Lionel Simeon Marks
 1941, edited by Lionel Peabody Marks
 1951, edited by Lionel Peabody Marks and Alison Peabody Marks
 1967, edited by Theodore Baumeister III
 6th edition, 1958, edited by Eugene A. Avallone, Theodore Baumeister III
 7th edition, golden (50th) anniversary, 1976?, edited by Theodore Baumeister III
 8th edition, edited by Theodore Baumeister III, Eugene A. Avallone
 9th edition
 10th edition, 80th anniversary, 1997, edited by Eugene A. Avallone, Theodore Baumeister III,
 11th edition, 90th anniversary, 2007, edited by Eugene A. Avallone, Theodore Baumeister III, Ali M. Sadegh
 12th edition, 100th anniversary, 2017, edited by Ali M. Sadegh, William M. Worek, Eugene A. Avallone

See also

References

External links
 Publisher's description

Mechanical engineering
Handbooks and manuals
1916 non-fiction books